The Distance is the second studio album by American blue-eyed soul singer Taylor Hicks, released on March 10, 2009. It is the first release by Hicks under his own independent label, Modern Whomp, after parting ways with Arista Records.

The Distance was produced by Simon Climie and features eleven tracks on the main version, including the single "What's Right Is Right" and "Nineteen", which tells the story of a teenage football star who joins the armed forces after the 9/11 attacks. Several tracks feature Nathan East and Doyle Bramhall II, both longtime members of Eric Clapton's band. "Seven Mile Breakdown" was originally recorded by Alabama indie band Spoonful James. It debuted at number 58 on the Billboard 200 and number five on the Top Independent Albums charts with sales of 9,000 copies in its first week of release.

Reception

Critical reception to the album was mixed to positive, with publications like Allmusic saying that "Hicks doesn't show great sensitivity as an interpreter(...) but as an entertainer he pulls out all the stops, determined to get every last person in the joint to crack a smile. It's a trait that served him well in those small clubs and on television, and it still serves him well here." Entertainment Weekly, however, gave the album a decidedly negative review, with Entertainment Weekly writer Simon Vozick-Levinson stating that Hicks is "no worse than any of the countless other graying dudes singing what they believe to be the blues in hotel lobbies and dive bars across the nation".

Track listing

Singles
"What's Right Is Right" peaked at number twenty-four on the US Billboard Hot Adult Contemporary Tracks.
"Seven Mile Breakdown" was released on May 4, 2009 to country radio.

Chart performance
The album sold approximately 9,000 copies in the US during its first official week of released; debuting at number 58 on the Billboard 200 and number five on the Top Independent Albums chart. It has sold 52,000 copies to date.

References

2009 albums
Taylor Hicks albums
Modern Whomp Records albums
Albums produced by Simon Climie